Jason Douglas (born February 14, 1973) is an American film, television and voice actor, known for portraying Tobin on AMC's The Walking Dead, voicing Beerus in the anime film Dragon Ball Z: Battle of Gods and the series Dragon Ball Super, and Krieg in the video game Borderlands 2  and its sequel, Borderlands 3.

Douglas is noted for his appearances in films, including Sin City, Parkland, Two Step and No Country for Old Men as well as recurring and guest appearances on hit TV shows such as Breaking Bad, The Leftovers, Nashville, The Night Shift, Preacher, and Cruel Summer.

In addition to the role of Beerus in the Dragon Ball franchise, his prolific voice acting career includes leading roles in Chainsaw Man, My Hero Academia, RWBY, Attack on Titan, One Piece, Fairy Tail, Psycho-Pass and Parasyte.

Filmography

Live-action

Film

Television

Voice acting

Anime

 A.D. Police: To Protect and Serve – Officer Hans Klief
 After the Rain (manga) – Masami Kondo
 Air Gear – Magaki, Yoshitsune
 Area 88 – Satoru Kanzaki
 Attack on Titan – Miche Zacharius
 Attack on Titan: Junior High – Miche Zacharius
 Azumanga Daioh – Chiyo's Father
 BECK: Mongolian Chop Squad – Rikya
 Black Butler – Claude Faustus
 Blade of the Phantom Master – Munsu
 Bubblegum Crisis Tokyo 2040 – Leon McNichol
 Cardcaptor Sakura: Clear Card – Fujitaka Kinomoto
 Casshern Sins – Dune
 Cat Planet Cuties – Matrey
 Chainsaw Man – Kishibe
 Chrome Shelled Regios – Fellmouse
 Chrono Crusade – Father Ewan Remington
 Cromartie High School – Takeshi Hokuto
 D.Gray-man – Yang (Ep. 51)
 Danganronpa: The Animation – Daiya Owada
 Darker than Black: Gemini of the Meteor – Goro Kobayashi
 Deadman Wonderland – Azuma Genkaku
 Devil Survivor 2: The Animation – Ronaldo Kuriki
 Dirty Pair Affair of Nolandia – Gooley
 Dirty Pair Flash – Touma
 Divergence Eve – Jean Luc LeBlanc
 Dragon Ball Super – Beerus
 Dragon Ball Z Kai – King Cold, South Kai
 Dr. Stone – Village Chief Kokuyo
 Elfen Lied – Bandoh
 Excel Saga – Il Palazzo
 Fairy Tail – Gildarts Clive
 Full Metal Panic: The Second Raid – Vincent Bruno
 Fullmetal Alchemist: Brotherhood – Major Miles
 Future Diary – Takao Hiyama (3rd)
 Gantz – Tetsuo
 Gasaraki – Kiyotsugu Gowa
 Gate (novel series) – Emperor Molt Augustus 
 Generator Gawl –  Kanae 
 Ghost in the Shell: Arise – Paz
 Gravion – Klein Sandman
 Guyver: The Bioboosted Armor – Oswald Lisker / Guyver II
 Grimoire of Zero - Mercenary
 Hero Tales – Chinjo (Ep. 4)
 Hetalia World Series – Germania
 Himouto! Umaru-chan - Takeshi Motoba
 Initial D – Seiji Iwaki (Funimation Dub)
 Innocent Venus – Buichi Nakahira
 Jinki: Extend – Ryouhei Ogawara
 Kaleido Star – Chikara Naegino
 Kenichi: The Mightiest Disciple – Isshinsai Ogata (Sage Fist)
 Kiba – Garl
 Kimagure Orange Road: Summer's Beginning – Kyosuke Kasuga
 Kurau: Phantom Memory – Doug
 Le Chevalier D'Eon – Duke of Orleans
 Level E – Kraft
 Maburaho – Haruaki Akai
 Magical Shopping Arcade Abenobashi – Ms. Aki
 Mezzo DSA – Tomohisa Harada
 Moon Phase – Yayoi Mido
 Made in Abyss – Gueira
 My Hero Academia – Fourth Kind
 Mythical Detective Loki Ragnarok – Frey
 Okami-san and her Seven Companions – Takashi Tonda (Eps. 8, 11)
 One Piece – Aokiji
 Orphen – Childman
 Panty & Stocking with Garterbelt – Brief's Father (Ep. 12b)
 Papuwa – Liquid
 Parasyte – Gotou
 Peacemaker Kurogane – Sanosuke Harada
 Prétear – Kaoru Awayuki
 Psycho-Pass – Tomomi Masaoka
 Rahxephon – Masaru Gomi
 Red Data Girl – Shingo Nonomura
 Rideback – Romanov Karenbach
 Rosario + Vampire – Kuyo
 RWBY: Ice Queendom - Jacques Schnee
 Rune Soldier – Louie
 Saint Seiya – Cygnus Hyoga
 Saiyuki – Homura
 Samurai Warriors - Ujiyasu Hojo
 Shadow Skill - Ragu
 Shakugan no Shana – Sydonay (seasons 2–3)
 Shangri-La – Reon Imaki
 Sorcerer Hunters – Marron Glace
 Soul Eater – Joe Buttataki
 Space Dandy – Idea (Ep. 11)
 Street Fighter II V – Ken (ADV dub)
 Super GALS! – Tatsuki Kuroi
 The Case Study of Vanitas – August Ruthven
 The Dawn of the Witch - Mercenary
 The Legend of the Legendary Heroes – Lieral Lieutolu
 Tokyo Majin – Raito Umon
 Toriko – Match
 Trinity Blood – William Walter Wordsworth
 Utawarerumono – Kurou
 Vinland Saga – Thors
 Wandaba Style – Michael Hanagata
 Xenosaga: The Animation – Ziggy
 Yugo the Negotiator – Yugo Beppu

Animation
 RWBY – Jacques Schnee

Film
 Appleseed – Edward Uranus III (Sentai dub)
 Dragon Ball Super: Broly – Beerus, King Cold
 Dragon Ball Super: Super Hero – Beerus
 Dragon Ball Z: Battle of Gods – Beerus
 Dragon Ball Z: Resurrection 'F' – Beerus
 Fullmetal Alchemist the Movie: Conqueror of Shamballa – Rudolf Hess
 Justice League x RWBY: Super Heroes & Huntsmen, Part One - Jacques Schnee
 Mass Effect: Paragon Lost – Archuk
 One Piece: Film Z – Aokiji
 Short Peace – Man (Possessions)
 Tales of Vesperia: The First Strike – Alexei
 Vexille – Saito

Video games
 Aliens: Colonial Marines – Cruz
 Borderlands 2 – Psycho, Krieg
 Borderlands 3 – Krieg — Cameo and Psycho Krieg and the Fantastic Fustercluck DLC Campaign 4
 Deus Ex: Invisible War – Sid Black
 Dragon Ball FighterZ – Beerus
 Dragon Ball Legends – Beerus
 Dragon Ball Xenoverse – Beerus
 Dragon Ball Xenoverse 2 – Beerus
 Dragon Ball Z: Battle of Z – Beerus
 Dragon Ball Z: Kakarot - King Cold, Beerus
 Dragon Ball Z: Ultimate Tenkaichi – Hero (Silent)
 Duke Nukem Forever – Generic Male Voices
 Mobile Suit Gundam: Battle Operation 2 - Neidhardt Heidegger
 Prominence – ren Keterek
 Smite – Ares, Dark Whisperer Ah Muzen Cab
 Unlimited Saga – Nuage / Dagle Bos

Awards and nominations

References

External links

 
 

Living people
American male film actors
American male stage actors
American male television actors
American male voice actors
1973 births